Rachel Woods (born 15 April 1989) is a Northern Irish politician who served as the Green Party Member of the Legislative Assembly (MLA) for North Down from 2019 to 2022, having replaced the party's former leader, Steven Agnew.

Early life 
Woods is from Holywood, Co. Down. She holds a degree in history and a master's from Queen's University Belfast. From the age of 15, Woods worked in hospitality as a cleaner, chef and bar worker. She also worked as a researcher and economic analyst for Analyse Africa, part of the Financial Times, and as a supervisor in Holywood bar The Dirty Duck Ale House.

Political career 
Woods joined the Green Party because she was "fed up screaming at the TV, fed up with politicians in my area who were supposed to represent me and who just didn't."

Woods served as a councillor for the Holywood and Clandeboye electoral area on Ards and North Down Borough Council from 2016 until her selection as an MLA in 2019.

Woods passed many amendments to the Domestic Abuse Bill, including widening access to legal aid for victims of abuse and changes to the “child aggravator” clause providing for tougher custodial sentences where a child could be impacted by abuse, as well as additional reporting requirements.

In 2022, her Safe Leave Bill passed the Assembly, making Northern Ireland the first region of the UK to provide 10 days paid leave to victims of domestic abuse. Upon passage, the Bill was said to be "a life saver for many people who are experiencing or have experienced domestic abuse."

She has called for votes at 16 in Northern Ireland elections and has been prominent in calls for the Northern Ireland local government pension scheme to divest from fossil fuels. In March 2022, the pension scheme moved £2.8 billion of its funds into low-carbon investments.

She lost her North Down seat  in the 2022 Northern Ireland Assembly election to Connie Egan of the Alliance Party.

References

1989 births
Living people
Councillors in County Down
Green Party in Northern Ireland MLAs
Feminists from Northern Ireland
Female members of the Northern Ireland Assembly
Northern Ireland MLAs 2017–2022
Politicians from Belfast
Green Party in Northern Ireland councillors
Women councillors in Northern Ireland